Human Playground is a Netflix original docuseries created by Hannelore Vandenbussche and narrated by Idris Elba. It explores several different unique and extreme sports "played" by different cultures around the world. It was released on September 30, 2022.

References

External links 
 
 
 

English-language Netflix original programming
2020s American documentary television series
Netflix original documentary television series
Documentaries about sports
2022 American television series debuts